Pink Motel is a 1982 American sex comedy film.

Premise
A couple who own a cheap hotel (Phyllis Diller and Slim Pickens, in his final role) must deal with the various eccentric people who rent their rooms. The New York Times called the film "an unfunny attempt at sexual comedy" and compared it to the TV love-anthology series Love, American Style.

References

External links

1982 films
American sex comedy films
1980s English-language films
1980s American films